Piddington may refer to:

Piddington (surname)
Piddington, Buckinghamshire
Piddington, Northamptonshire
Piddington railway station
Piddington Roman Villa
Piddington, Oxfordshire
Piddington and Wheeler End
Mount Piddington